Penttilä is the surname of the following people
Eero Akaan-Penttilä (born 1943), Finnish politician
Eino Penttilä (1906–1982), Finnish javelin thrower
Erkki Penttilä (1932–2005), Finnish wrestler
Johan Penttilä (1891–1967), Finnish wrestler
Risto E. J. Penttilä (born 1959), Finnish politician
Sinikka Luja-Penttilä (1924–2023), Finnish politician and writer
Timo Penttilä (1931–2011), Finnish architect

See also
15224 Penttilä, asteroid